Albert Fleming, Jr. (April 5, 1954 – May 14, 2003) was a professional basketball small forward who played one season in the National Basketball Association (NBA) as a member of the Seattle SuperSonics during the 1977–78 season.

He attended the University of Arizona where he played for the basketball program. When he finished his career, he was the all-time school leader for scoring. He has since moved down to the tenth all-time in scoring, as well as fifth in field goal percentage and fourth in rebounds per game.

Fleming was drafted by the Phoenix Suns during the second round (30 pick overall) in the 1976 NBA Draft, but was waived before the start of the season. He signed with the Pacers on October 13, 1976, but was waived a week later. In July, he signed with the SuperSonics and finished the season with them. Seattle waived Fleming in November 1978.

After his career in the NBA was over, he played with teams in Sweden, Italy, Israel, Portugal and Uruguay. Fleming played for the Anchorage Northern Knights of the Continental Basketball Association during the 1977–78 season.

Fleming retired at age 28 and resided in his hometown of Michigan City, Indiana. After being diagnosed with cancer five years prior, Fleming died after on May 14, 2003, at age 49.

References

External links

1954 births
2003 deaths
American men's basketball players
Anchorage Northern Knights players
Arizona Wildcats men's basketball players
Basketball players from Indiana
People from Michigan City, Indiana
Phoenix Suns draft picks
Seattle SuperSonics players
Small forwards
Basketball players from Chicago